The Wild Honey Suckle is a 1786 poem by American author Philip Freneau. Its style and tone is often considered a reaction to the neoclassicism of poets like Alexander Pope and an early anticipation of Romantic poetry. The poem was first printed on July 6, 1786 in the Columbian Herald.

Themes and critical response
The poem describes a secluded honeysuckle and makes observations about mortality. Paul Elmer More praised the "unearthly loveliness" of Freneau's "The Wild Honey Suckle" but noted that "even a clever journeyman's hand could alter a word here and there for the better."

References

External links
The Wild Honey Suckle in Poems written and published during the American revolutionary war, and now republished from the original manuscripts by Philip Morin Freneau

American poems
1786 poems